Kellyn Taylor née Johnson (born July 22, 1986) is an American long distance runner.

Prep
Kellyn graduated from Sussex Hamilton High School in Wisconsin where she was a state 1600 meter champion as a senior. Kellyn earned District Runner of the Year honors and was a four-year Wisconsin Interscholastic Athletic Association state qualifier in both cross country and track. Kellyn lettered in cross country, basketball, and track.

NCAA
In 2009, she finished 3rd at the NCAA indoor championships in the mile for the Wichita State Shockers.

Johnson, a 2006 graduate from Cloud County, is an aspiring Olympian and was a perennial All-American during her college career as a cross country and track athlete in Concordia for the Cloud County Thunderbirds for the Cloud County Community College and at Wichita State University. "She had an outstanding career when she was here. She ran everything from the 4X400 relay clear up the longest distance races like the 5,000-meter," said Cloud County head women's track coach, Ted Schmitz. "She was a driven athlete that hated to lose. She'd do anything to win a race. I hope our kids take away that hard work gets you places. Sometimes you might have to face adversity, but if you have a goal you need to stay with it and pursue your dream." Taylor, who met her husband Kyle Taylor while in Concordia, still owns the school records at Cloud County in the indoor distance medley relay (12:38.22), 1,000-meter run (2:57.9), mile run (4:59.5), and outdoor 3,000-meter steeplechase (11:25.9).

Her success continued at Wichita State where Taylor finished third at the 2009 indoor NCAA Championships in the mile, and 10th in the 5000-meter outdoor championships.

Professional
In 2012, Kellyn finished 10th at 10,000 meters and 14th at 5,000 meters at the US Olympic Trials (track and field).

In 2014, Taylor won a national title at the 25 km distance.

At the 2015 Pan American Games she finished 3rd in the 5000 meters.

Also in 2015, she took second at the 2015 Pan American Cross Country Cup and first at the 2015 NACAC Championships in Athletics in the 5000 meters. Kellyn placed 3rd in 2015 Toronto Pan Am Track and Field Championships in 5000 meters in 15:52.78.

Kellyn placed 6th in Los Angeles at She competed at the 2016 US Olympic Marathon Trials. 2016 IAAF World Half Marathon Championships placing 25th in 1:12:42.

Kellyn Taylor placed fourth in 10,000 m behind Molly Huddle, Emily Infeld, and Marielle Hall at 2016 United States Olympic Trials (track and field) and was an alternate to represent  at Athletics at the 2016 Summer Olympics.

In late 2016, Taylor trained and passed Firefighter Level I and II courses to qualify to Firefighting in the United States instead of racing a Fall marathon.

Kellyn Taylor placed thirteenth in 2017 London Marathon in 2:28:51.

She won the 2018 Grandma's Marathon in 2:24:28, setting a course record in the process. Kellyn Taylor's time made her the 7th fastest marathoner in US women’s history.

Taylor ran in the 2020 U.S. Woman's Olympic Trials Marathon February 29 in Atlanta, Georgia. She stayed in a lead pack for more than half the race, but Aliphine Tuliamuk and Molly Seidel pulled away and went first and second, respectively. Sally Kipyego was the third to make the team. Taylor finished 8th at 2:29:55.

After the COVID-19 pandemic put a year hold on the U.S. Olympic Trials for track and field, Taylor was able to enter the 10,000 meter at the field in Eugene, Oregon in June. The summer was one of the hottest ever experienced on the West Coast, and on a hot track, Taylor held pace with the leaders, but couldn't stay up front as Emily Sisson stretched out the pack. Taylor finished 12th of 44 runners in 32:42.

References

External links
 
 
 Northern Arizona Elite Kellyn Taylor profile
 Hoka One One Kellyn Taylor profile

1986 births
Living people
American female long-distance runners
American female marathon runners
Pan American Games track and field athletes for the United States
Pan American Games medalists in athletics (track and field)
Athletes (track and field) at the 2015 Pan American Games
Wichita State Shockers women's cross country runners
Wichita State Shockers women's track and field athletes
Pan American Games bronze medalists for the United States
Medalists at the 2015 Pan American Games